Johnnie McLaurin was an American baseball outfielder in the Negro leagues. He played with the Jacksonville Red Caps in 1944, Birmingham Black Barons in 1945, and the Newark Eagles in 1948. In some sources, his career in combined with Felix McLaurin.

References

External links
 and Baseball-Reference Black Baseball stats and Seamheads

Birmingham Black Barons players
Jacksonville Red Caps players
Newark Eagles players
Year of birth missing
Year of death missing
Baseball outfielders